Rops is a mountain in Kosovo with a height of . It is a part of Bogićevica area in the Prokletije.

Notes and references 

Notes:

References:

Mountains of Kosovo
Accursed Mountains
Two-thousanders of Kosovo